The 2014 BBL-Pokal – officially 2014 Beko BBL-Pokal for sponsorship reasons – was the 47th season of the German Basketball Cup. The Final Four was held in Ulm, which gained ratiopharm Ulm automatic qualification. The other six participating teams were selected through the standings in the 2013–14 Basketball Bundesliga. ALBA Berlin defended their title.

Participants
The following six teams qualified based on their standings in the 2013–14 BBL.
Bayern Munich
Brose Baskets
ALBA Berlin
EWE Baskets Oldenburg
Telekom Baskets Bonn
Artland Dragons
Ratiopharm Ulm was qualified because the Final Four was played on their home court.

Bracket

Quarterfinals

Semifinals

Third place game

Final

External links
Official website

BBL-Pokal seasons
BBL-Pokal